James Edward Anyon (born 5 May 1983) is a former cricketer who played for Sussex.

He was educated in Lancashire before going to Loughborough University where Warwickshire spotted him playing for the university. He made his debut for the Bears against Somerset in April 2005 and played fairly often throughout the season, a season which included a hat trick which helped the Bears to beat Somerset in a Twenty20 game.

He spent time on loan at Surrey in the 2009 season after losing his place in the Warwickshire side and signed a two-year deal with Sussex in November 2009.

In April 2016 he announced his retirement from first-class cricket due to a long-standing injury.

References

External links
 

1983 births
Living people
Alumni of Loughborough University
Cricketers from Lancaster, Lancashire
Cumberland cricketers
English cricketers
Loughborough MCCU cricketers
Surrey cricketers
Sussex cricketers
Warwickshire cricketers